Nose-picking is the act of extracting nasal mucus with one's finger (rhinotillexis) and may include the subsequent ingestion of the extracted mucus (mucophagy).  
In Western cultures, this act is generally considered to be socially deviant; parents and pediatricians have historically tried to prevent development of the habit and attempt to break it if already established.  Mucophagy is a source of mockery and entertainment in the media.

Prevalence
Nose-picking is an extremely widespread habit: some surveys indicate that it is almost universal, with people picking their nose on average about four times a day. A 1995 study of nose-picking, requesting information from 1,000 randomly selected adults from Wisconsin USA gathered 254 responses. It defined nose-picking as "the insertion of a finger (or other object) into the nose with the intention of removing dried nasal secretions". Of those who responded, 91% said they were current nose-pickers (but only 75% of these believed everyone did it), and two respondents claimed to spend between 15 and 30 minutes and between one and two hours a day picking their noses.

Mucous membranes in the nasal cavity constantly produce a wet mucus that removes dust and pathogens from the air flowing through the cavity. For the most part, the cilia that also line the cavity work to move the mucus toward the throat, where it can be swallowed. However, not all the mucus stays fluid enough to be moved by the cilia. The closer the mucus is to the nostril opening, the more moisture it loses to the outside air, and the more likely it is to dry out and become stuck. Once dried, the mucus typically causes a sensation of irritation that leads to the compulsion to dislodge the itch by picking. Other reasons to remove excess dried mucus include impaired breathing through the nose and a concern that it may be visible to others in the nostril openings.

In some cultures, nose-picking is considered a private act akin to defecation, urination, flatulence,  burping, or masturbation. Mucophagy, which is eating the extracted mucus, may be considered more taboo, and is sometimes portrayed in comedies.

Rhinotillexomania
When nose picking becomes a body-focused repetitive behavior or obsessive–compulsive disorder it is known as rhinotillexomania. Most cases do not meet this pathological threshold. When it does, however, treatments similar to other BFRBs can be employed, such as habit reversal training and decoupling.

Medical risks and benefits
The environment of the nose and the dried secretions removed contain many micro-organisms.  When a person is contagious with a cold, flu or other virus, it is important that hands or other objects used to remove mucus are washed promptly because there is risk of introducing micro-organisms to other parts of the body or other people since it is a norm to shake hands in many societies.

Picking one's nose with dirty fingers or fingernails may increase risks of infection that may include an increase in the diversity of nose flora (and thus infection or illness), or occasional nosebleeds. One case of rhinotillexomania resulted in perforation of the nasal septum and self-induced ethmoidectomy. In children, the most common complication related to nose picking is epistaxis (nosebleed). Infections or perforation of the nasal septum are uncommon, but can occur.  Nose picking, however, should not affect the sense of smell, as the nasal cavity where the olfactory nerves are located is too high up to reach.

Some scientists claim that mucophagy provides benefits for the human body. Friedrich Bischinger, an Austrian doctor specializing in lungs, advocates using fingers to pick nasal mucus and then ingesting it, stating that people who do so get "a natural boost to their immune system".   The mucus contains a "cocktail of antiseptic enzymes that kill or weaken many of the bacteria that become entangled in it", so reintroducing the "crippled" microorganisms "may afford the immune system an opportunity to produce antibodies in relative safety". However, other scientists argue that,"because boogers are made from the same ingredients as the mucus we swallow every day, ... eating boogers doesn’t matter much to your immune system".

See also
 Allergic salute (wiping of the nose with the hand)
 Eating mucus
 Nasal irrigation
 Neti (Hatha Yoga)
 Nose-blowing

References

External links

 BBC home: The Truth About Nose-picking
 Toddlers and Nose Picking
 
 
 
 For an elaborate spoof, see "Nose-picking in the Pongidae and Its Implication for Human Evolution", said to be from the American Journal of Nasal Anatomy, (1987)
The TLC Foundation for Body-Focused Repetitive Behaviors

Body-focused repetitive behavior
Habit and impulse disorders
Rhinology